Ursela Monn (born 2 December 1950) is a Swiss actress and singer.

Career
Monn is the daughter of a Swiss father and an Irish mother. From the age of 11 onward, she received ballet lessons. A year later, she attended the Max Reinhardt Seminar in Vienna. Her first stage role was a reproduction of Fiddler on the Roof. There, she collaborated with Boy Gobert of which before they concluded their drama at the Thalia Theatre in Hamburg. In 1976, she retired from there.

Monn's breakthrough came through the role of Rieke in the 13-part ZDF series , based on the eponymous novel by Hans Fallada. This was followed by numerous appearances in television series and films. From 1998, Monn has played in theatres in Berlin, especially in the Renaissance Theatre, as well as in Munich and Düsseldorf. She has also appeared at the Theater an der Wien and the Theater am Neumarkt. Since 2006, she has portrayed Charlotte Baumgart in the television series Zoo Doctor: My Mom the Vet.

Monn also released albums as Rieke Jesänge, where she sang Berlin chansons.

She received the Order of Merit of Berlin and the Federal Cross of Merit for her advocacy of palliative care by hospices. On 20 January 2006, Monn was appointed as an ambassador for the Stiftung Pflege (Care Foundation), a German charity.

Personal life
Monn was married to English director Ralph Bridle. Her current husband is Michael Wintzer. She has a son, Marc (born 1981), and lives in Berlin.

Filmography

Films 
 1978: 
 1980: 
 1985: 
 1986: Geld oder Leber!
 1986: November Cats
 1988: Ein Schweizer namens Nötzli
 2006: Wo ist Fred?
 2014: Rico, Oskar und die Tieferschatten
 2015: Rico, Oskar und das Herzgebreche

TV 
 1973: 
 1974: Tatort  – episode: "Gift"
 1975:  (TV series)
 1976:  (TV miniseries)
 1978:  (TV miniseries)
 1979: So 'ne und so 'ne
 1979: For All the Gold in the Transvaal
 1979: Ick baumle mit de Beene
 1981: Das Traumschiff – episode: "Die erste Reise: Karibik" (TV series)
 1985: Spiel im Schloß
 1986: Jokehnen (TV series)
 1986: Zieh den Stecker raus, das Wasser kocht
 1986: Didi – Der Untermieter (TV series)
 1987: Praxis Bülowbogen – Rhythmusstörungen
 1987: Wartesaal zum kleinen Glück
 1989: Berliner Weiße mit Schuß – Ist das 'n Urlaub (TV series)
 1989: Eine Bonner Affäre
 1989: Derrick – Die Kälte des Lebens (TV crime series)
 1990: Mich will ja keiner
 1991–1993: Der Hausgeist
 1991–1993: Unser Lehrer Doktor Specht (TV series)
 1993: Vater braucht eine Frau (Serie)
 1993: Stich ins Herz
 1994: Die Kommissarin – episode: "Schokoladenkönig", as Dagmar Lang (TV series)
 1997: Großstadtrevier – episode: "Das zweite Gesicht" (TV series)
 1998: Dr. Monika Lindt (TV series)
 1999: Der Landarzt (TV series)
 1999–2000: Klinik unter Palmen (TV series)
 2004: Das Bernstein-Amulett (TV film)
 2004: Liebe ohne Rückfahrschein
 2006–2010, 2013: Tierärztin Dr. Mertens (TV series)
 2008–2011: Doctor's Diary (TV series)
 2009: Tango im Schnee
 2009: SOKO 5113 (TV series)
 2012: Plötzlich 70! (TV series)
 2013: Rosamunde Pilcher: Alte Herzen rosten nicht
 2015: Einfach Rosa (TV series)

Radio plays 
 Regina Regenbogen, as narrator
 Julia, die Meisterdetektivin (two-part radio drama series), as Julia
 Kleine Hexe Klavi-Klack (radio drama series 1978–1984), as Klavi-Klack
 TKKG, episodes: "Die weiße Schmuggler-Yacht", "Anschlag auf den Silberpfeil", "Hotel in Flammen", Schüsse aus der Rosenhecke"
 Die drei Fragezeichen und der heimliche Hehler – episode 37, as Regina
 Antares 8 (radio drama), as Tatjana
 Das Geheimnis der englischen Silberschalen by Stefan Murr (1980)

Awards 
 1978: Golden Camera for Ein Mann will nach oben
 1979: Bambi Award
 1979: Berlin Art Prize, category 'Performing Arts'
 1985: Ernst-Lubitsch-Award for Girl in a Boot
 1985: German Film Award 'Beste Darstellerin' for Girl in a Boot
 1997: Order of Merit of Berlin
 2001: Order of Merit of the Federal Republic of Germany
 2005: Goldener Vorhang of the Club Theatre Berlin for 'Best Role' in Acht Frauen, with Robert Thomas
 2009: German Comedy Award for Doctors Diary as 'Best Comedy Series'
 2015: Berliner Bär (award of German newspaper B.Z.)

Further reading 
  Andreas Kotte (publisher): Theaterlexikon der Schweiz. Volume 2, Chronos, Zürich 2005, p. 1260 f.

References

External links 
 

1950 births
Swiss television actresses
Swiss film actresses
20th-century Swiss actresses
21st-century Swiss actresses
Recipients of the Cross of the Order of Merit of the Federal Republic of Germany
Living people
Swiss people of Irish descent
Recipients of the Order of Merit of Berlin